Wallace Leandro de Souza (born 26 June 1987), known by the mononym Wallace, is a Brazilian volleyball player, member of the Brazil men's national volleyball team, 2016 Olympic Champion, silver medallist of the Olympic Games (London 2012), 2014 and 2018 World Championship, three–time South American Champion (2011, 2013, 2017).

After winning the bronze medal of 2022 FIVB Volleyball Men's World Championship, he announced his retirement from Brazil national team.

In January 2023 Wallace expressed his desire to see Brazilian president Lula murdered, publishing a social media poll alongside a photo of himself holding a gun, asking his followers “Would you shoot Lula in the face with this 12 [shotgun?]” 

The post caused great controversy. The Brazilian Olympic Committee forwarded a representation to the Ethics Council of the entity about the case and the minister of the Social Communication Secretariat of the Federal Government, Paulo Pimenta, called the Attorney General's Office (AGU). Finally, Sada Cruzeiro announced Wallace's suspension indefinitely.

Later, Wallace deleted the post and apologized for what happened: "Anyone who knows me knows that I would never incite violence under any circumstances, especially to our President. So, I come here to apologize, it was an unfortunate post that I ended up making. I was wrong."

Sporting achievements

Clubs
 FIVB Club World Championship
  Betim 2013 – with Sada Cruzeiro
  Betim 2015 – with Sada Cruzeiro
  Betim 2021 – with Sada Cruzeiro
  Betim 2022 – with Sada Cruzeiro

 CSV South American Club Championship
  Linares 2012 – with Sada Cruzeiro
  Belo Horizonte 2014 – with Sada Cruzeiro
  Taubate 2016 – with Sada Cruzeiro

 National championships
 2011/2012  Brazilian Championship, with Sada Cruzeiro
 2013/2014  Brazilian Championship, with Sada Cruzeiro
 2014/2015  Brazilian Championship, with Sada Cruzeiro
 2015/2016  Brazilian Championship, with Sada Cruzeiro
 2020/2021  Turkish Cup, with Spor Toto

Individual awards
 2011: Pan American Games – Best Spiker
 2012: FIVB Club World Championship – Best Server
 2013: FIVB Club World Championship – Most Valuable Player
 2013: FIVB World Grand Champions Cup – Best Opposite Spiker
 2014: CSV South American Club Championship – Most Valuable Player
 2014: CSV South American Club Championship – Best Opposite Spiker
 2014: FIVB Club World Championship – Best Opposite Spiker
 2016: FIVB World League – Best Opposite Spiker
 2016: Olympic Games – Best Opposite Spiker
 2017: FIVB World League – Best Opposite Spiker
 2017: CSV South American Championship – Best Opposite Spiker
 2019: Memorial of Hubert Jerzy Wagner – Best Server
 2021: FIVB Nations League – Most Valuable Player (shared with Bartosz Kurek)
 2021: FIVB Nations League – Best Opposite Spiker

References

External links
 Player profile at Olympic.org
 Player profile at CEV.eu
 Player profile at WorldofVolley.com
 Player profile at Volleybox.net

1987 births
Living people
Sportspeople from São Paulo
Brazilian men's volleyball players
Olympic volleyball players of Brazil
Olympic medalists in volleyball
Olympic silver medalists for Brazil
Olympic gold medalists for Brazil
Volleyball players at the 2012 Summer Olympics
Medalists at the 2012 Summer Olympics
Volleyball players at the 2016 Summer Olympics
Medalists at the 2016 Summer Olympics
Pan American Games medalists in volleyball
Pan American Games gold medalists for Brazil
Volleyball players at the 2011 Pan American Games
Medalists at the 2011 Pan American Games
Universiade medalists in volleyball
Universiade bronze medalists for Brazil
Brazilian expatriate sportspeople in Turkey
Expatriate volleyball players in Turkey
Volleyball players at the 2020 Summer Olympics
Opposite hitters